Hi-Tech Medical College, Rourkela is a Semi government medical school in India affiliated to sambalpur University. It is in Rourkela, Odisha. The college is a privately funded institute with autonomy to run its internal administration. Hi-Tech Medical college is both an educational institute that imparts undergraduate medical training and a working hospital that provides medical care to a large number of patients.

Every year it admits 100 undergraduate students.

Administration
Hi-Tech Medical College is recognized by University Grants Commission and Medical Council of India.

It is a self-financing medical college for MBBS degrees affiliated by Sambalpur University. Hi-Tech Medical College & Hospital, Bhubaneswar is a sister institute which is affiliated to Utkal University. Both these medical colleges run under the administration of Vigyan Bharati Charitable Trust.

References

External links 
 Website

Private medical colleges in India
Medical colleges in Odisha
Universities and colleges in Rourkela
Educational institutions established in 2012
2012 establishments in Odisha